University Towers is a tall residential apartment building in Ann Arbor, Michigan. It stands at 536 South Forest Avenue. The building was constructed in 1965 and stands at 19 floors, with 240 units/rooms. The high-rise also contains a fitness center.

It was designed in the international architectural style, using concrete and glass as its main materials.

University Towers started a major renovation project in 2014–2015. Improvements to the lobby, amenities, resident apartments and services have been modernized. Also, for reasons that remain unknown, the 13th floor of the building was removed. The total project completion is estimated for the summer of 2016.

Amenities
 Outdoor pool
 Fitness center
 Coffee lounge
 Laundry
 24 hour desk attendants
 Complimentary Internet, cable, heat
 WiFi study lounge

Second-floor apartments
In 2012, University Towers renovated its second floor into separate luxury apartments. A new entrance was created for residents of the second floor, which can be accessed on South University St.

Gallery

References

External links
 University Towers Website
 Google Maps location of University Towers
 
 

University of Michigan campus
Skyscrapers in Ann Arbor, Michigan
Buildings and structures completed in 1965
1965 establishments in Michigan
Residential skyscrapers in Michigan